Arturo ten Heuvel (born 20 December 1978) is a Dutch retired footballer who played for HFC Haarlem, FC Volendam, FC Den Bosch, KSV Roeselare, Katwijk and Ajax Zaterdag during the span of his playing career. He is currently a youth coach, managing the D2 squad (under-13) at Almere City FC.

Career
He began his career with HFC Haarlem and FC Volendam, and later played for FC Den Bosch before being released in May 2008 at the end of his contract.

He is the younger brother of Laurens ten Heuvel.

References

External links
Career stats at Voetbal International

1978 births
Living people
Dutch footballers
Association football wingers
HFC Haarlem players
FC Den Bosch players
FC Volendam players
K.S.V. Roeselare players
AFC Ajax (amateurs) players
Challenger Pro League players
Dutch expatriate footballers
Expatriate footballers in Belgium
Dutch expatriate sportspeople in Belgium
Footballers from Amsterdam